Laketown Township is a civil township of Allegan County in the U.S. state of Michigan. The population was 5,505 at the 2010 census.

Communities
Castle Park is an unincorporated private community in the township, consisting of approximately 100 cottages and summer houses along Lake Michigan. It is situated on the former Castle Park estate of Michael Schwarz. Schwarz's brick, turreted castle-style house, built in 1890, now serves as the enclave's community center.  There was a post office here from 1903 until 1953.

Macatawa is a small unincorporated community near Lake Michigan on Lake Macatawa that once was home to resorts catering to visitors from Chicago. Nearly all that remains of these resorts was destroyed in several fires. It is now home to primarily cottages. The community is on the boundary between Laketown Township in Allegan County and Park Township in Ottawa County; however, it is on the south side of Lake Macatawa separated from most of Park Township. It has a "PO Box only" post office with the ZIP code of 49434.

Graafschap is a small unincorporated community, with areas in both Fillmore Township and Laketown Township.

Geography

Demographics

As of the census of 2000, there were 5,561 people, 2,080 households, and 1,591 families residing in the township. The racial makeup of the township was 96.04% White, 0.50% African American, 0.07% Native American, 0.88% Asian, 0.11% Pacific Islander, 1.51% from other races, and 0.88% from two or more races. Hispanic or Latino of any race were 3.70% of the population.

There were 2,080 households, out of which 34.8% had children under the age of 18 living with them, 69.4% were married couples living together, 4.5% had a female householder with no husband present, and 23.5% were non-families. 18.8% of all households were made up of individuals, and 6.2% had someone living alone who was 65 years of age or older.  The average household size was 2.66 and the average family size was 3.07.

In the township the population was spread out, with 27.1% under the age of 18, 6.9% from 18 to 24, 27.7% from 25 to 44, 27.1% from 45 to 64, and 11.3% who were 65 years of age or older.  The median age was 39 years. For every 100 females, there were 100.0 males.  For every 100 females age 18 and over, there were 98.8 males.

The median income for a household in the township was $60,893, and the median income for a family was $69,440. Males had a median income of $46,698 versus $31,597 for females. The per capita income for the township was $29,377.  About 1.3% of families and 2.8% of the population were below the poverty line, including 1.9% of those under age 18 and 4.4% of those age 65 or over.

References

Notes

Sources

External links
 Laketown Township official website
 Early History of Laketown Township

Townships in Allegan County, Michigan
Townships in Michigan